The men's single sculls competition at the 1952 Summer Olympics took place at Meilahti, Helsinki, Finland. The event was held from 20 to 23 July. There were 18 competitors from 18 nations, with each nation limited to a single boat in the event. The event was won by Yuriy Tyukalov of the Soviet Union, in the nation's debut at the Games. Defending champion Mervyn Wood took silver, the fourth medal in five Games for Australia. Teodor Kocerka's bronze was Poland's first medal in the men's single sculls.

Background

This was the 11th appearance of the event. Rowing had been on the programme in 1896 but was cancelled due to bad weather. The single sculls has been held every time that rowing has been contested, beginning in 1900.

Five of the 14 single scullers from the 1948 Games returned: gold medalist Mervyn Wood of Australia, silver medalist Eduardo Risso of Uruguay, fourth-place finisher John B. Kelly Jr. of the United States, eighth-place finisher Ian Stephen of South Africa, and twelfth-place finisher Juan Omedes of Spain. Wood had also won his second Diamond Challenge Sculls earlier in 1952 and was the favorite. Significant challengers included Risso, Kelly, Tony Fox of Great Britain (1951 Diamond Challenge winner), Paul Meyer of Switzerland, and Ian Stephen of South Africa.

Chile, Saar, and the Soviet Union each made their debut in the event. Great Britain made its 10th appearance, most among nations, having missed only the 1904 Games in St. Louis.

Competition format

This rowing event was a single scull event, meaning that each boat was propelled by a single rower. The "scull" portion means that the rower used two oars, one on each side of the boat. The course returned to the 2000 metres distance that became the Olympic standard in 1912 (with the exception of 1948).

The competition expanded from previous years to include a second repechage after the semifinals. This brought the tournament to five rounds total: quarterfinals, semifinals, and a final with two repechages after the first two rounds. 

Four heats were held in the first round. The first two boats in each heat advanced to the semifinals, while the rest went to the first repechage. The repechage round also consisted of four heats. Only the winner of each heat advanced to the second repechage (these rowers did not compete in the semifinals). The winners of the two semifinal heats advanced directly to the final and the rest competed in the second repechage. Three heats were held in the second repechage, where the winner of each heat advanced to the final.

Schedule

All times are Eastern European Summer Time (UTC+3)

Results

Quarterfinals

Quarterfinal 1

Quarterfinal 2

Quarterfinal 3

Quarterfinal 4

First repechage

First repechage heat 1

First repechage heat 2

First repechage heat 3

First repechage heat 4

Semifinals

Semifinal 1

Semifinal 2

Second repechage

Second repechage heat 1

Second repechage heat 2

Second repechage heat 3

Final

Results summary

References

External links

Rowing at the 1952 Summer Olympics